The Owl Who Married a Goose: An Eskimo Legend is a 1974 Canadian animated short from Caroline Leaf, produced by the National Film Board of Canada and the Department of Indian and Northern Affairs.

Synopsis
Leaf worked with Inuit artists in the interpretation and design of this film which uses sand on a glass slide lit from below (sand animation) to tell this classic Inuit legend. Despite being from different species, an owl and goose marry. When the goose obeys nature and joins the other geese migrating south, the owl follows but can't keep up, and when the geese stop over on a lake, the owl is unable to float on the water and sinks to the bottom. Although the birds speak to each other in Inuktitut without subtitles, there is little doubt about what is transpiring.

Reception 
Millimeter wrote, “The film is one of exquisite delicacy and bitter sweet humor, a triumph of sincere animation in a technique far removed from traditional cel methods.”

Monthly Film Bulletinwrote, “Caroline Leaf displays in this abstract love story the rich and tonal skills which she later used to effect in The Street."

Awards and nominations 
 Canadian Film Award – Animated Short, Non-Feature Overall Sound
 BAFTA – Nomination for Best Animated Short
 Ottawa International Animation Festival – First Prize, Films for Children

References

External links

1974 films
1974 animated films
1970s stop-motion animated films
Canadian animated short films
Inuit films
Inuit mythology
Sand animated films
Inuktitut-language films
Best Animated Short Film Genie and Canadian Screen Award winners
Films based on legends
Films about owls
Fictional geese
Films directed by Caroline Leaf
National Film Board of Canada animated short films
1970s Canadian films